Osmia spinulosa, also known as the spined mason bee, is a species of bees within the genus Osmia.

Description 
7-8 mm. Males: Tergite 15 with terminal ligaments, Tergite 7 with a thorn. To be recognized in the field with experience. Females: Tergites 1-6 with terminal ligaments. Scutellum laterally with a pointed thorn each. Tibial spur red.

Range 
Osmia spinulosa is distributed from the Spanish foothills of the Pyrenees (Girona) across Europe, Asia Minor, Caucasus and western Central Asia to the Central Siberian mountains (Tomsk, Kemerovo, Altai Republic); north to South Wales and Central England, in Scandinavia to 60 ° N in Norway and Sweden, in Russia to Kirov and Perm; south to Sicily and southern Bulgaria. Detected from all federal states in Germany with the exception of Schleswig-Holstein. Widespread in Germany, but only sporadically in the North German lowlands. Moderately frequent, especially in the hill country and in the limestone low mountain ranges. In the Alps up to 2000 m. Reported in Austria from all federal states. Currently in Switzerland, partly also historically from the cantons of Geneva, Neuchâtel, Bern, Basel, Schaffhausen, Valais, Graubünden and St. Gallen, only historically from the canton of Vaud.

Habitat 
Mainly settlements with focus on dry, warm habitats on calcareous subsoil. It occurs on inland dunes and drifting sand fields, weathering heaps, disused quarries, fallow sheep pastures (juniper heaths), warm forest fringes, structurally rich, old fallow vineyards, uneven meadows, rarely dry and warm ruderal areas.

Ecology 
Osmia spinulosa is an univoltin species. It flies from early June to mid-August and is wintering as a resting larva (?) in a snail shell.

Osmia spinulosa is an oligolectic species specializing in Asteraceae. A preference for certain species is not discernible. Pollen sources are Anthemis tinctoria, Anthemis arvensis, Inula hirta, Inula salicina, Inula ensifolia, Buphthalmum salicifolium, Pulicaria dysenterica, Aster amellus, Senecio jacobaea, Echinops spaerocephalus, Cirsium vulgare, Cirsium arvense, Carduus crisous, Cichorium intybus, Picris hieracioides, Leontodon autumnalis, Hieracium pilosella. Telekia speciosa and Calendula officinalis are also used in the Munich Botanical Garden. Buphthalmum is of great importance as a source of pollen in the limestone mountains. The females do not visit the same flowers all the time; during one flight they regularly visit up to four different asteraceae (e.g. Hieracium / Centaurea / Anthemis / Echinops). The plant species mentioned can also serve as sources of nectar.

This bee nests in empty smaller snail shells like Helicella itala and Helicella obvia, Cepaea nemoralis, Zebrina detrita and Futicicola fruticum, once also found in a small shell of Helix pomatia. The building material used is chewed plant parts (plant mortar) from the edges of the leaves of Sanguisorba minor and Potentilla reptans and not, as previously suspected due to a misinterpretation, hare or sheep dung. In contrast to other snail shell nests, the surface of the snail shell is not covered with vegetable mortar. After completing the nest, the bee turns the entrance of the snail shell downwards so that the opening points downwards.

Stelis odontopyga is a cuckoo bee parasiting Osmia spinulosa. Other known parasites are Stelis phaeoptera, Chrysura cuprea, Chrysura dichroa and Chrysura trimaculata, as well as Melittobia acasta, Pteromalus apum and Pteromalus venustus. Anthrax aethiops became known as a further breeding parasite.

Etymology 
Diminutive from Latin "spinosa" = "thorny, prickly"; because of the thorny scutellum.

Taxonomy 
Subgenus Hoplosmia THOMSON, 1872.

References 

spinulosa